Fishguard Harbour railway station serves the port of Fishguard Harbour, Wales.  It is the terminus of one of the branches of the West Wales Line from Swansea. The area is also now served (since it reopened on 14 May 2012) by Fishguard and Goodwick railway station.

History 

The Great Western Railway took over the North Pembrokeshire and Fishguard Railway by agreement of 12 February 1898. Its intent was to turn Fishguard into a purpose-built ocean liner port because it wanted to take trans-Atlantic passenger traffic away from Plymouth and Southampton. In preparation of this, the GWR opened its first station, Fishguard & Goodwick railway station, in 1899 when work on the new port began with the construction of Fishguard Harbour's East breakwater.

In conjunction with building the East Breakwater, a new  railway would be built to connect to the liner terminal with the West Wales line. The line, which would bypass the steeper gradients and curves on this part of the original line, would have a deep cutting, embankments and two tunnels. However, within two years, the project to build the breakwater and ocean-going terminal was abandoned after it became clear silting (which could not be prevented by dredging) would prevent large ocean-going ships from ever using the port. The East Breakwater was left unfinished. Although two sections of the new railway to the proposed port terminal were completed before the project ended, they were abandoned and never used. Rail traffic would continue to use the original route to Goodwick.

Despite being unable to complete the project as envisaged, the GWR still wanted to create a new port. The  North Breakwater was created in deeper water by quarrying stone from the headland at Goodwick. The quarried-out area became the new quay and terminus for the West Wales line.
However, passengers had to be transferred ashore to the waiting London train by tender due to the shallowness of the harbour.

Current facilities 
The station is not owned by Network Rail but by Stena Line. A large part of the station is contained within the port building where there is seating and toilets. However, there are no railway ticket machines and the station is staffed only by Stena Line personnel, no rail staff are employed there. This means there is no rail ticket office and passengers travelling from Fishguard by train must purchase their tickets in advance by post, at a different station, or on board their train. The majority of passengers using the station are in possession of SailRail tickets issued at Rosslare Europort or another station in Ireland. The station has step-free access throughout and the station's owners, Stena Line, permit smoking on the platform. The station also has both long and short stay parking. The minimum connection time from Fishguard Harbour is seven minutes, and when bus replacement services are operating, the buses leave from the car park adjacent to the level crossing.

 
After the ban on smoking in public became law in Wales in April 2007, the station became the only one in the UK where it was still permitted. Stena Line allowed passengers to continue to smoke on the platform because it was deemed too dangerous for them to smoke at the nearest point where it was technically permissible: a level crossing over a busy road. Smoking is banned at all stations operated by Network Rail.

Rail services 
Since the station is located in the harbour, its primary purpose has always been providing links with sea going transport. As such, there have always been daily services to and from Fishguard Harbour which coincide with the ferry services to Rosslare in Ireland.

Historic services

1949 
 There were two night-time express trains that ran daily to and from London Paddington.

April 1964 to May 2003 

 All the services serving the other stations on the branch were withdrawn on 6 April 1964, leaving the station served by boat trains only. This was during the Beeching cuts period.
 Since that date the only scheduled passenger services have been the boat trains.
 In recent years these have been one night service and one day service all year round, despite the summer-only fast ferry. At one stage the night service was formed of an InterCity 125 train running direct to/from London Paddington. The daytime service was the same, although perhaps for only part of the year. British Rail, and later First Great Western and its predecessor Great Western Trains all operated InterCity 125 services to Fishguard Harbour.
 In 2000, the night service was still operated by First Great Western (using InterCity 125s) but the daytime train was operated by Wales & West, meaning there were no longer any daytime through services to Paddington.
 Wales & West's services were transferred to Wales & Borders when Wales & West was split up.

May 2003 to September 2003 
In 2003 the remaining First Great Western Fishguard services were withdrawn when the franchise was taken over by Wales & Borders. This ended almost a century of direct services to or from London Paddington. However, through services to and from other stations were added to the timetable.

 The night-time train started from London Waterloo every-day, connecting with Eurostar continental services, with the train arriving at 02.38 Tuesday to Saturday mornings, and 01.00 Sunday and Monday mornings. Because of this later arrival on Tuesday to Saturday, this arriving service ran empty to Carmarthen rather than form a return journey.
On Tuesday to Saturdays, this was formed of empty stock run from Carmarthen, whereas on Sundays and Mondays, it was formed of the incoming train from Waterloo.
 On Saturdays, the daytime train went to and from 

From September 2003 to September 2011 
Arriva Trains Wales took over from Wales & Borders in December 2003
 These daytime services therefore avoided  in both directions. This is normally achieved using the Swansea District Line, but occasionally the service was routed via the "Swansea Avoiding Line" around the back of Landore Train Maintenance Depot instead.
 A daily train operated at night, arriving and leaving Fishguard Harbour between 1am and 2am.
 As maintenance of the railways is predominantly done at night, this train was frequently replaced by buses. This was normally known well in advance.

From September 2011 to May 2017 
All services were operated by Arriva Trains Wales. The level of service was greatly enhanced from 12 September 2011 when five extra services per day in each direction commenced running to and from Fishguard Harbour Mondays to Saturdays. The five extra services are as follows:

Outbound 
 One trip to 
 Two trips to

Inbound 
 Two arrivals from 
 The other was later extended to start from Gloucester
These are provided on a trial basis until September 2014 and are in addition to the two daily 'boat-trains', one at lunch time and one in the dead of night, which provide the traditional ferry connections.
The extra services are the first regular timetabled services to Fishguard Harbour that have not been provided solely for connection with ferries since local services were withdrawn in 1964. Since the additional services only run Monday to Saturday, only the two trains connecting with ferry services serve the station on a Sunday.

The decision to introduce additional trains has been credited to two teenagers from Moylegrove who collected a 1,440 signature petition in support of the move. A consultation was held in May/June 2011 on the planned services, but did not result in much adjustment to the times. The additional trains for Fishguard initiative has guaranteed funding until 2014, during which a review will be carried out to identify demand and passenger numbers and future funding.

2017 
The ferry sailing schedule was significantly revised in May 2017 resulting in changes to the train times. As a result, there are no longer trains during the night and the 01.50 departure is discontinued. From May 2018 it was proposed to extend the 19.30 from Manchester to Carmarthen to Fishguard Harbour, returning at 02.37 to Carmarthen, with an equivalent bus replacement in the early hours of Sunday.

2021
Due to the COVID-19 pandemic, services on the Fishguard branch have been reduced. As of August 2021, there are two daily departures from Mondays to Saturdays - one at midday, and one in the late evening. Both services run to Carmarthen, with the midday service continuing to Cardiff Central.

On Sundays, there is an increased service of three trains per day. The additional mid-afternoon service runs to Swansea.

References

External links 

Campaign Against New Beeching Report
Fishguard Trains: independent news and discussion
Information on the rail & sea route via Fishguard-Rosslare

Railway stations in Pembrokeshire
DfT Category E stations
Former Great Western Railway stations
Railway stations in Great Britain opened in 1906
Railway stations served by Transport for Wales Rail
Railway stations serving harbours and ports in the United Kingdom
Fishguard
Privately owned railway stations in the United Kingdom